Shades of Truth (Traditional Chinese: 水滸無間道; literally Water Margin's Unceasing Path) is a 25-episode television comedy-drama from Hong Kong. Produced by Siu Hin-fai, the drama is a TVB production. The story is a parody on the legendary story of Wu Song from the 14th century Chinese classical novel Water Margin (水滸傳) and also the 2002 Hong Kong crime-thriller film Infernal Affairs (無間道).

Synopsis
Brothers of Mount Liang,
Together through birth and death. 
Reunited after generations,
In a bid to bring justice.

900 years ago, Wu Song and Lin Chong were best friends, just like their characters from Water Margin. They were as close as brothers and swore to uphold justice together even in their next lives.

900 years later after they reincarnate to Hong Kong, they meet again as the young patrol officer Dung Chung Cho (Julian Cheung) and top police official TC Lam (Wong Hei). Under the orders of police official KY Wong (Gordon Liu), Dung Chung Cho is sent to the triad controlled by Sung Po (Yuen Wah) as an undercover. In only several months time, Dung Chung Cho successfully gains Sung Po's trust and also wins the heart of Nichole (Gigi Lai), Sung Po's biological daughter.

After a slight injury on the head, Dung Chung Cho gains his past memories as Wu Song 900 years ago and tries to convince TC that he is his long lost brother Lin Chong. Meanwhile, one of Sung Po's men, Kwan Lo (Derek Kwok) begins to suspect Dung Chung Cho as an undercover for the police and is also plotting to overthrow Sung Po's position in the gang. How come the police can never gather enough information to capture the triads for holding illegal businesses and charge them for attempting to murder so many people? It is then when Dung Chung Cho begins to realize that there is also an undercover in the police force working for the triads.

Cast

Police force

Triad

Chinese Medical Center (Hong family)

Leung San Pak Bar (Man family)

Miscellaneous

Soundtrack 
Theme song: 沒有半分空間 by Wong Hei 
Sub-Theme song: In Another Time by Jodie Simmons

References

External links
 TVB Square's Review
 spcnet.tv's Review

TVB dramas
Works based on Water Margin
2004 Hong Kong television series debuts
2005 Hong Kong television series endings